This is an alphabetical list of abandoned airports in Canada that were at one time important enough to warrant an article. Most of these also appear in :Category:Defunct airports in Canada. This list is sorted by province or territory.

Alberta
List of airports in Alberta

 Acme Airport
 Andrew Airport
 Bjorgum Farm Airport
 Cadotte Airport
 Caroline Aerodrome
 Chinchaga Airport
 Conklin Airport
 Cowpar Airport
 Didsbury (Vertical Extreme Skydiving) Aerodrome
 Edmonton City Centre (Blatchford Field) Airport
 Edmonton/St. Albert Airport
 Embarras Airport
 Fontas Airport
 Fitzgerald (Fort Smith) Water Aerodrome
 Forestburg Airport
 Fort Chipewyan/Small Lake Water Aerodrome
 Grande Cache Airport
 Grist Lake Airport
 Hamburg Aerodrome
 High Level/Footner Lake Water Aerodrome
 RCAF Station High River
 Lethbridge/Anderson Aerodrome
 Liege/CNRL Aerodrome
 RCAF Station Lincoln Park
 Milk River (Madge) Airport
 Olds/North 40 Ranch Aerodrome
 RCAF Station Pearce
 Red Deer/South 40 Airstrip
 St. Francis Airport
 St. Lina Aerodrome
 Steen Tower Airport
 Turner Valley Bar N Ranch Airport
 RCAF Station Vulcan
 Zama Airport
 Zama Lake Airport

British Columbia
List of airports in British Columbia

 Alice Arm/Silver City Water Aerodrome
 Barkerville Airport
 Bronson Creek Airport
 CFB Chilliwack
 Clinton/Bleibler Ranch Aerodrome
 Crawford Bay Airport
 Dawson Creek Water Aerodrome
 Dog Creek (ex. RCAF)
 Eddontenajon/Iskut Village Airport
 Esquimalt Airport
 Finlay Bay Water Aerodrome
 Fort Grahame Water Aerodrome
 Fort Nelson/Mobil Sierra Airport
 Fort St. John/Tompkins Mile 54 Airport
 Gang Ranch Airport
 Kahntah Aerodrome
 Canadian Forces Station Ladner
 Mayne Island Water Aerodrome
 Minoru Park
 Minstrel Island Water Aerodrome
 Mission Water Aerodrome
 Peggo Devon Canada Aerodrome
 Penticton Water Aerodrome
 Poplar Beach Resort Water Aerodrome
 Port Alice/Rumble Beach Water Aerodrome
 Port Simpson Water Aerodrome
 Port Washington Water Aerodrome
 Prince George (North Cariboo Air Park) Airport
 Quilchena Airport
 Rykerts Water Aerodrome
 Scar Creek Airport
 Scum Lake Airport
 Sechelt/Porpoise Bay Water Aerodrome
 Takla Narrows Aerodrome
 Tasu Water Aerodrome
 Tipella Airport
 Tsacha Lake Airport
 Telegraph Creek Airport
 Vanderhoof (District) Water Aerodrome
 Williams Lake Water Aerodrome

Manitoba
List of airports in Manitoba

 Arnes Airport
 Canadian Forces Base Portage la Prairie
 Gilbert Plains Airport
 Gimli Industrial Park Airport
 Gods Lake Narrows Water Aerodrome
 Hartney Airport
 Matheson Island Airport
 Pukatawagen Water Aerodrome
 Shilo Heliport (CFB Shilo)
 Shilo (Flewin Field) Heliport (CFB Shilo)
 Ste. Rose du Lac Airport
 The Pas/Grace Lake Water Aerodrome
 Virden (West) Airport
 Wabowden Water Aerodrome
 Warren/Woodlands Airport

New Brunswick
List of airports in New Brunswick
 RCAF Station Pennfield Ridge
 Saint-Quentin Aerodrome

Newfoundland and Labrador
List of airports in Newfoundland and Labrador

 Naval Station Argentia
 Bay d'Espoir Aerodrome
 Bonavista Aerodrome
 Border Beacon
 Buchans Airport
 Ernest Harmon Air Force Base
 Hope Brook Aerodrome
 Livingston Aerodrome
 Menihek Aerodrome
 Michelin Falls Aerodrome
 Paradise River Airport
 Saglek Airport
 Twin Falls Aerodrome
 Williams Harbour Airport

Northwest Territories
List of airports in the Northwest Territories

 Arctic Red River Water Aerodrome
 Colomac Airport
 Fitzgerald (Fort Smith) Water Aerodrome
 Fort McPherson Water Aerodrome
 Fort Providence Water Aerodrome
 Hay River/Brabant Lodge Water Aerodrome
 Mould Bay Airport
 Nahanni Butte Water Aerodrome

Nova Scotia
List of airports in Nova Scotia

 Apple River Airport
 Amherst Airport
 Fancy Lake Water Aerodrome
 Langille Lake Water Aerodrome
 Middle Stewiacke Airport
 Halifax Civic Airport
 Tatamagouche Airport
 Valley Airport
 Waterville/Kings County Municipal Airport
 Waverley/Lake William Water Aerodrome

Nunavut
List of airports in Nunavut

 Doris Lake Aerodrome
 Frobisher Bay Air Base
 Lupin Airport
 Nanisivik Airport

Ontario
List of airports in Ontario

 Armstrong/Waweig Lake Water Aerodrome
 Atwood Airport
 RCAF Detachment Alliston
 Armour Heights Field
 Arnstein Airport
 Arthur (Metz Field) Aerodrome
 Barker Field
 Barrie/Little Lake Water Aerodrome
 Batchawana Water Aerodrome
 Belwood (Wright Field) Aerodrome
 Caledonia/Grand River Water Aerodrome
 Chapleau Water Airport
 Cushing Lake Water Aerodrome
 Deer Lake Water Aerodrome
 Deer Lake/Keyamawun Water Aerodrome
 De Lesseps Field
 Dorset/Kawagama Lake (Old Mill Marina) Water Aerodrome
 Downsview Airfield
 Durham (Mulock) Airport
 Dunnville Airport
 Eagle River Airport
 Ear Falls Airport
 Fergus (Royland Field) Aerodrome
 Five Mile Lake Water Aerodrome
 Fort Erie Airport
 Gananoque Water Aerodrome
 Gowganda/Gowganda Lake Water Aerodrome
 Grand Valley (Madill Field) Aerodrome
 Haliburton Water Aerodrome
 Hawkesbury (Windover Field) Airport
 Huntsville/Deerhurst Resort Airport
 Killaloe/Bonnechere Airport
 Kincardine (Ellis Field) Airport
 King City Airport
 Kingston Airfield
 Lake Rosseau/Cameron Bay Water Aerodrome
 Lake Rosseau/Morgan Bay Water Aerodrome
 Lake Rosseau/Windermere Water Aerodrome
 Leaside Aerodrome
 Lefroy Airport
 Little Current Water Aerodrome
 Long Branch Aerodrome
 Lucknow Airpark
 Mac Tier/Francis Island Water Aerodrome
 Maple Airport
 Nakina/Lower Twin Lake Water Aerodrome
 New Liskeard Airport
 New Lowell Airport
 Nobleton Airport
 Norwood Airport
 Orangeville/Brundle Field Aerodrome
 Orton/Smith Field Airport
 Palmerston Airport
 Parry Sound/Derbyshire Island Water Aerodrome
 Pays Plat Water Aerodrome
 Perry Lake Water Aerodrome
 Pikangikum Water Aerodrome
 Port Elgin (Pryde Field) Airport
 Sault Ste. Marie/Partridge Point Water Aerodrome
 Selkirk/Kindy Airstrip
 Sioux Narrows Airport
 Stoney Point (Trepanier) Aerodrome
 Straffordville Airport
 Thessalon Municipal Airport
 Terrace Bay Airport
 Timmins/Porcupine Lake Water Aerodrome
 Toronto Aerodrome
 Willowdale Airfield
 Winchester Airport
 Windermere Airport

Prince Edward Island
List of airports in Prince Edward Island

 Grand River Airport
 RCAF Station Charlottetown
 RCAF Station Mount Pleasant
 CFB Summerside

Quebec
List of airports in Quebec

 Caniapiscau Aerodrome
 Cartierville Airport
 Chambly Airport
 L'Assomption Airport
 Chibougamau/Lac Caché Water Aerodrome
 Lac Gobeil Water Aerodrome
 Lac-des-Îles Water Aerodrome
 Lac à la Perchaude Airport
 Lac Gagnon Water Aerodrome
 Lac Kaiagamac Water Aerodrome
 Lac Sept-Îles Water Aerodrome
 Lennoxville (Airview) Airport
 Maniwaki/Blue Sea Lake Water Aerodrome
 Matagami Water Aerodrome
 Matoush Aerodrome
 Mont-Tremblant/Lac Duhamel Water Aerodrome
 Mont-Tremblant/Lac Ouimet Water Aerodrome
 Montréal/Boucherville Water Aerodrome
 Montréal/Île Sainte-Hélène Water Airport
 Montréal/Marina Venise Water Airport
 Montréal/Mascouche Airport
 Opinaca Aerodrome
 Ottawa/Gatineau Water Aerodrome
 Parc de la Vérendrye (Le Domaine) Water Aerodrome
 Pontiac Airpark
 Pontiac Airpark Water Aerodrome
 Rivière Saint-Maurice (Aviation Maurice) Water Aerodrome
 Roberval (Air Saguenay) Water Aerodrome
 CFB St. Hubert
 Sainte-Agnès-de-Dundee Aerodrome
 Sainte-Julienne Aerodrome
 Sainte-Lucie-de-Beauregard Aerodrome
 Aérodrome Saint-Louis
 Senneterre Airport
 Stanhope Airport
 Témiscaming/Lac Kipawa Water Aerodrome
 Victoria STOLport

Saskatchewan
List of airports in Saskatchewan

 Beechy Airport
 Buttress, Saskatchewan
 Cluff Lake Airport
 Cudworth Airport
 Cut Knife Airport
 RCAF Station Dafoe
 Davin Lake Airport
 Eastend Airport
 Estevan/Bryant Airport
 Estevan (South) Airport
 Ferland Airport
 Gainsborough Airport
 Hague/Guliker Field Aerodrome
 Hanley Airport
 Hidden Bay Airport
 Imperial Airport
 La Loche Water Aerodrome
 Lewvan (Farr Air) Airport
 Lumsden (Metz) Airport
 Naicam Airport
 Nipawin Water Aerodrome
 North Battleford/Hamlin Airport
 Otter Lake Airport
 Paradise Hill Airport
 Redvers Airport

 Rocanville Airport
 Spiritwood Airport
 Squaw Rapids Airport
 Wawota Airport
 West Poplar Airport
 White City (Radomsky) Airport
 Wilkie Airport
 Willow Bunch Airport

Yukon
List of airports in Yukon

 Dawson City Water Aerodrome
 Faro/Johnson Lake Water Aerodrome
 Haines Junction/Pine Lake Water Aerodrome
 Teslin Water Aerodrome

See also
 List of airports in Canada
 List of heliports in Canada

 
Lists of airports in Canada
Canada